Syngenoherpiidae is a family of solenogaster, a shell-less worm-like mollusk. 

This family comprises the sole genus Syngenoherpia.

References

 Salvini-Plawen L v. (1978). Antarktische und subantarktische Solenogastres (eine Monographie: 1898-1974). Zoologica (Stuttgart) 128: 1-305.

Solenogastres